Bettina Horváth-Pásztor (born 1 December 1992, in Fehérgyarmat) is a Hungarian handball goalkeeper who plays for Váci NKSE. She made her senior debut on 2 September 2010 against UKSE Szekszárd.

In 2012, she participated at the 2012 Women's Junior World Handball Championship in the Czech Republic.

She debuted in the national team on 30 May 2018 against Kosovo.

Achievements
Nemzeti Bajnokság I:
Winner: 2011
Magyar Kupa:
Winner: 2011
EHF Champions League:
Semifinalist: 2011

References

External links 
 Bettina Pásztor career statistics at Worldhandball

1992 births
Living people
Sportspeople from Szabolcs-Szatmár-Bereg County
Hungarian female handball players
Győri Audi ETO KC players